Alessio Lisci (born 4 November 1985) is an Italian football manager and former player.

Career
Born in Rome, Lisci played mainly for Promozione sides, and notably represented Serie D side A.C.D. Guidonia Montecelio during his senior career. After retiring, he started working at Lazio as a fitness coach for the youth sides.

Lisci successively applied for youth coaching jobs at a number of Spanish clubs in 2011; Atlético Madrid and Levante UD were the only two offering him a position, with Lisci accepting the latter after Atleti only offered him a eight-a-side football job. He started as an assistant for the Juvenil A side while managing an eight-a-side football team; in his first two years at Levante, he worked also as a representative in the Italian food trading market in Valencia as a second job.

Lisci left Levante in 2016 when manager Miguel Ángel Villafaina was sacked, but returned just months later after being named in charge of the Juvenil B side. On 12 June 2018, he was named manager of Levante's Juvenil A squad.

On 15 December 2020, Lisci replaced Luis Tevenet at the helm of the reserves in Segunda División B. He managed to avoid relegation with the side at the end of the season, as the club was kept in Segunda División RFEF.

On 1 December 2021, Lisci was appointed interim manager of the first team in La Liga, after manager Javier Pereira was sacked. He made his debut at the helm of the club in the following day, in a 8–0 away routing of CD Huracán Melilla, for the season's Copa del Rey.

Lisci's professional debut on occurred on 5 December 2021, a 0–0 home draw against CA Osasuna. Two days later, he was definitely appointed manager of the Granotas until the end of the campaign.

Despite taking over the Granotes in the last position, Lisci kept his side with options of survival until the last rounds, when the club's relegation was confirmed. On 30 June 2022, after his contract expired and Levante announced Mehdi Nafti as manager, he left after refusing the role of Methodology Director, stating a "desire to manage".

Managerial statistics

References

External links

1985 births
Living people
Footballers from Rome
Italian footballers
Italian football managers
La Liga managers
Segunda División B managers
Segunda Federación managers
Atlético Levante UD managers
Levante UD managers
Italian expatriate football managers
Italian expatriate sportspeople in Spain
Expatriate football managers in Spain
Association footballers not categorized by position